Paris Holiday may refer to:
 Paris Holiday (1958 film), an American comedy film
 Paris Holiday (2015 film), a Chinese-Hong Kong romantic comedy film